, informally known as "Shieki", is a passenger railway station located in the city of Matsuyama, Ehime Prefecture, Japan. It is operated by the private transportation company Iyotetsu. The stations the terminus for the Iyo Railway's rail, tram, and bus lines and forms one of Matsuyama's city centers.

Lines
During most of the day, railway trains arrive every fifteen minutes. Trains continue from Matsuyama City Station on the Yokogawara Line to Yokogawara Station. The station is also served by the  Yokogawara Line, and the Gunchū Lines. A tram station in front of the station building is the terminus for five of the six streetcar lines with the exception of Line 6, and the Botchan Ressha, a replica of the original Iyo Railway locomotives.

Layout
The station building houses one elevated island platform and one side platform connected by an underground concourse. The station is attended. The station building is also home to the Matsuyama branch of the Takashimaya department store chain. There is also an arcade beneath the station, known as Matsuchika Town.

Platforms

History
It was Matsuyama's first central train station, preceding the JR Matsuyama Station by four decades, and was on the first railway in Shikoku and the third private railway in Japan. The first Iyotetsu line ran between the City Station and the port of Mitsugahama (now called Mitsuhama), with an interim stop at Komachi. It was renamed   on 20 July 1889, and back to "Matsuyama Station" on 1 June 1902. The station renamed to its present name on 1 March 1927 when its name was usurped by the Japanese Government Railways' Matsuyama Station.

Surrounding area
Iyotetsu Takashimaya Main Building: Shikoku's Largest Department Store
Matsuyama City Ekimae Underground Shopping Center (Matsuchika Town): Shikoku's only underground shopping center
Iyotetsu Head Office

See also
 List of railway stations in Japan

References

External links

Iyotetsu Station Information

Railway stations in Ehime Prefecture
Railway stations in Japan opened in 1888
Railway stations in Matsuyama, Ehime
Iyotetsu Takahama Line